Novoromanovka is a rural locality (a selo) in Tarumovsky District, Republic of Dagestan, Russia. The population was 1,237 as of 2010. There are 10 streets.

Geography 
Novoromanovka is located 24 km southeast of Tarumovka (the district's administrative centre) by road. Novogeorgiyevka is the nearest rural locality.

References 

Rural localities in Tarumovsky District